Vaterpolski klub Jug  is a professional water polo club based in Dubrovnik, Croatia. The club was established in 1923 as part of sports society "JUG". As of the 2021–22 season, VK Jug competes in the Croatian League, Regional League A1 and LEN Champions League.

History

1923–1941
Since establishment in 1923, Jug was one of the most successful water polo clubs in Yugoslavia. It won fourteen Yugoslav Water Polo Championship titles in Kingdom of Yugoslavia.

1945–1991
During the existence of SFR Yugoslavia, Jug was among the elite Yugoslav water polo clubs, winning a total of eights Yugoslav Water Polo Championship titles; three in a row from 1949 to 1951, four in a row from 1980 to 1983, and their last one in 1985. Jug also won its first European title, the Champions Cup, in 1981. It also won the National Cup of Yugoslavia in 1981 and 1983.

1991–2008
After the breakup of Yugoslavia in 1991, Jug won six Croatian First League of Water Polo championships and eight Croatian Water Polo Cup titles until the 2007–08 season. It cemented its dominance in Croatia by winning the top-tier continental 2000–01 LEN Champions League and 2005–06 LEN Euroleague titles.

2008–present
In the 2008–09 season, Jug won the inaugural season of the Regional Water Polo League. From 2009–10 to 2014–15, Jug was five-time runner-up in the competition and finished in third place once. In Croatia, it won five consecutive championship titles from 2008–09 to 2012–13 and Croatian Cup in the 2008–09 season.

In the 2015–16 season, Jug set a record by winning all competitions it played in. After taking the Croatian League championship and Croatian Cup title, Jug won the Regional Water Polo League for the second time in club's history and was crowned the 2015–16 LEN Champions League champion for fourth time in club's history.

Starting the 2016–17 season, Jug won the 2016 LEN Super Cup. Jug defended the Regional Water Polo League title in 2016–17, but was stopped in the final of the 2016–17 LEN Champions League by Hungarian team Szolnoki. In the 2017–18 season, Jug won third Regional League title in a row and lost in third-place game of the 2017–18 LEN Champions League.

In the 2018–19 season, Jug failed to defend the Regional Water Polo League title for fourth season in a row, losing to HAVK Mladost. Also, in the 2018–19 LEN Champions League, it lost in the quarterfinals to Hungarian team Ferencvárosi with 10–9.

Honours

Current squad
Season 2021–22

Staff

Recent seasons

 Cancelled due to the COVID-19 pandemic.

References

External links
 

Sports clubs established in 1923
Water polo clubs in Croatia
Water polo clubs in Yugoslavia
LEN Euroleague clubs
Sport in Dubrovnik